The following is a list of Australian specialty television programmes which have debuted, or are scheduled to debut in 2010.

Telemovies

Specials

Documentaries

References

Australian television-related lists